The Golem (original Yiddish title דער גולם, Der Goylem) is a 1921 "dramatic poem in eight scenes" by H. Leivick. The story is a reworking of a legend of Judah Loew ben Bezalel, known as the Maharal, a great rabbi of Prague. In the legend, he animates a golem, a being crafted from inanimate material. The same legends had provided the ground for Gustav Meyrink's 1915 novel of the same name.

In both cases, there is an admixture of material of Christian origin and probably influence from Mary Shelley's Frankenstein. Leivick's version includes several messiah figures including "The Man With the Cross", and is strongly focused on the plight of the golem, animated against his will and wrestling with his particular form of the human condition, and, secondarily, of the rabbi, a "creator whose creation does not respond in accordance with his plan". (Landis, 1972, 221)

Leivick referred to this work as a "dramatic poem" rather than a "play". As originally written, it was unstageable, requiring, for example, that flames flicker out of their own accord and that actors be visibly knocked about (and even bloodied) by invisible forces; furthermore, the full piece would probably take at least four hours to stage, perhaps longer. However, stageable versions were soon developed, and the play became a standard of Yiddish theater.

An Off-Broadway stage version (starring Robert Prosky and Joseph McKenna), produced and adapted from Leivick by David Fishelson, achieved success in early 2002, receiving a "Best Supporting Actor" nomination for McKenna by the Outer Critics Circle, as well as a Sunday Arts feature article in The New York Times. The play was published by Dramatists Play Service in 2003.

A stage version of The Golem based on Leivick's poem has recently been published by the American playwright Howard Rubenstein and premiered at the Penn Theatre, San Diego.

Footnotes

References
 Landis, Joseph C. (translator and editor), The Great Jewish Plays. New York:Horizon. 1972 , 1986: 
 Rubenstein, Howard. The Golem: Man of Earth: A play in two acts based on historical events, a medieval Jewish legend, kabbalah, and the Yiddish dramatic poem by H. Leivick, Granite Hills Press, 2007.  

1921 plays
Golem
Yiddish-language literature
Yiddish plays